Bollimunta Sivaramakrishna (Telugu: బొల్లిముంత శివరామకృష్ణ) (27 November 1920 – 7 June 2005) was an Indian writer.

Literary works
Antaratma Antyakriyalu[kadha samputi]
Mrutyunjayulu[Novel]
Sukshmamlo moksham[kadha samputi]
E Endaka godugu

Patrika nyayam
Telangana swatantra ghosha
Quit kashmir
Dharmasamsthapanarthaya
Rajakiya gayopakhyanam
Rajakiya kurukshetram
Donga dorikindi
Kalasi andaru batakali
Neti bharatam
Bhale manchi chowkaberamu

Cinema field
He wrote dialogues for about 50 movies particularly those of V. Madhusudhana Rao. Successful amongst them are Manushulu marali, Praja nayakudu, Sharada, Kalyana mandapam, Manchi rojulu Vachaayi, Nimajjanam, "Kaalam Marindi", "Bhadrakaali", "Shanti", "Punaadi Raallu", etc.

 Vagdanam (1961) (screenplay)
 Tirupathamma Katha (1963) (dialogues)
 Sridevi (1970) (dialogues)
 Kalam Marindi (1972) (dialogues)

Publications
Bollimunta Śivarāmakrishna kathalu, Bollimunta Sivaramakrishna, Visalandhra Publishing House
, Hyderabad (1990) ; .
Bollimunta Śivarāmakrishna kathānikalu, kathalu, Bollimunta Sivaramakrishna, Visalandhra Publishing House, Hyderabad (1972)

References

External links
 

Telugu people
Novelists from Andhra Pradesh
1920 births
2005 deaths
People from Guntur district
Telugu-language writers
20th-century Indian novelists
Indian editors
20th-century Indian dramatists and playwrights
Indian male screenwriters
Screenwriters from Andhra Pradesh
20th-century Indian male writers
20th-century Indian screenwriters